I Am Thor is a documentary about the life of bodybuilder and rock musician Jon Mikl Thor of the band Thor.  The film was directed by Ryan Wise and produced by Ryan Wise and Alan Higbee and had its world premiere at the 2015 Slamdance Film Festival.

Plot 
I am Thor is the story of Jon Mikl Thor, a bodybuilding, steel bending, brick smashing rock star in the 1970s and 1980s whose theatrical band Thor hit the scene alongside Metallica and Kiss, but never achieved the gold record status of its contemporaries. After a brief but memorable film career saw him starring in the cult classics Rock 'n' Roll Nightmare and Zombie Nightmare, Thor all but disappeared from the entertainment map. But ten years into retirement, and incapable of living like a normal mortal human being, Thor attempts a comeback to achieve the level of success that had eluded him his entire career – a comeback that nearly kills him. Tracing the rise, fall, and rebirth of a determined performer over the course of a career that has seen more than its fair share of highs and lows, I AM THOR paints a fascinating and sometimes unbelievable portrait of this larger-than-life icon.

Release 
After premiering at the Slamdance Film Festival in January 2015 the film then went on to screen at film festivals including Florida Film Festival, Calgary Underground FIlm Festival, Brooklyn Film Festival, New Zealand International Film Festival, and the Fantasia International Film Festival where it won the Audience Award for Best Documentary.

It was picked up for worldwide distribution by MPI Media Group where it was released in theaters and video-on-demand on November 20, 2015. To coincide with this release, Jon Mikl Thor went on a US tour of major cities, screening the new film followed by a live concert.

The film was released on DVD and Blu-Ray in the United States on January 19, 2016.

The film was released on DVD, Blu-ray, and VOD in Canada on March 11, 2016.

The film was released on Netflix in USA, Canada, and Scandinavia in June, 2016.

Reception 
The film received positive reviews from critics. On Rotten Tomatoes it has an approval rating of 91% based on reviews from 11 critics. 
  Screen Anarchy called it "a very winning documentary."  Audiences everywhere named I Am Thor one of the 10 Best Documentaries of 2015. Frank Scheck of The Hollywood Reporter called it "an entertainingly eccentric doc".

References

External links 
 Official Website

Documentary films about rock music and musicians
Cultural depictions of Canadian men
Cultural depictions of rock musicians
Cultural depictions of bodybuilders
2015 films
American documentary films